Cycling at the 2017 Summer Deaflympics in Samsun consisted of two disciplines: Mountain bike racing and Road bicycle racing. Mountain bike racing was held at Ondokuz Mayıs University mountain bike trail on 24 July 2017, while road bicycle racing was held at 19 Mayis District in Ondokuzmayıs from 19 to 25 July 2017.

Medal summary

Medalists

Road cycling

Mountain biking

References

External links
 Road cycling
 Mountain biking

2017 Summer Deaflympics